2012 Regional League Division 2 Northern Region is the fourth season of the League competition since its establishment in 2009. It is in the third tier of the Thai football league system.

Changes from last season

Team changes

Promoted clubs
No club was promoted to the Thai Division 1 League. Last years league champions Phitsanulok and runners up Lamphun Warrior failed to qualify from the 2011 Regional League Division 2 championship pool.

Relegated clubs
Chiangmai were relegated from the 2011 Thai Division 1 League.

Relocated clubs
Paknampho NSRU  re-located to the Regional League Northern Division from the Regional League Bangkok Area Division.

Stadium and locations

League table

References

External links
Football Association of Thailand  

Regional League Northern Division seasons
Nor